Anders Blomquist (born 17 October 1960 in Bromma, Sweden) is Swedish former cross-country skier, competing for IFK Lidingö and Åsarna IK at club level. In 1988, he shared the Vasaloppet victory together with his brother Örjan Blomquist. For many years, he has been an SVT commentator during skiing events. Until March 2010, he was the CEO for Destination Funäsdalen.

References 

1960 births
Living people
Swedish male cross-country skiers
Vasaloppet winners
IFK Lidingö skiers
Åsarna IK skiers